Kadıncık 2 hydroelectric plant is a privately owned hydroelectric power station located in Mersin Province, Turkey.

History
The plant was put into service in 1974. In 2016, within the privatization program, Kadıncık 2 plant, together with Kadıncık 1 plant, was purchased by İbrahim Çeçen holding for  864.1 million (where $1 =  2.887 ).

Technical characteristics
The installed power is 56 MW. The annual energy capacity is 307 GWh, which is equivalent to the energy requirement of 56,742 households. Kadıncık 2 power station is the fourth highest energy producer in Mersin Province.

See also

 Kadıncık 1 hydroelectric power plant

References

Buildings and structures in Mersin Province
Tarsus District
Hydroelectric power stations in Turkey
Dams in Mersin Province